Kid Cannabis is a 2014 American biographical comedy-drama film. It is based on the true story of a teen named Nate Norman who dropped out out of highschool to build a multimillion-dollar marijuana ring by trafficking drugs with his friends through the woods across the US-Canada international border.

Plot
The plot is based on a true story and follows Nate Norman, an eighteen-year-old high school dropout, who lives with his younger brother and single mom in northern Idaho. One day while delivering pizza he encounters a wealthy customer who tells him about the money to be made through drug trafficking marijuana from Canada. Nate later reads about the potency of Canadian weed in High Times Magazine and decides to recruit his friend Topher to help him with his grand plan. On their initial run, they cross the border to search for a supplier which leads them to a man who sells them $1,800 worth of marijuana. However, they quickly discover later that the marijuana they purchased was of lower quality than they intended to purchase.  Despite the low quality, the product proves successful and sells immediately, resulting in another run across the border. During their subsequent trip they meet Nicole (Merritt Patterson) who sells them 300 pounds of her dad's premium quality marijuana, which would become their supply. After the success of this run and now that a high-quantity supplier has been secured, Nate secures a financier and establishes his credibility. He then recruits and trains additional friends, promising to pay them $3500 each a run. Following daily runs, they revel in their successes, indulging in lavish purchases and throwing major parties. At a party, Nate has an encounter with a rival drug trafficker, Brendan Butler, who worries he’s losing business to Nate and his team. The two get into a gunfight and Brendan flees. Fearing for his business, Brendan hires two hitmen to rob and kill Nate and Topher. After a close call with the two hitmen, Nate understands the threat on his life and hires the hitmen out from under Brendan, unbeknownst to his team. The hitmen later murder Brendan and  dump his body in the woods. Topher begins working in secret with others he personally recruited on drug runs, attempting to hide this from Nate. One of these runs leads to a shady participant trying to steal some marijuana for himself by hiding it in the woods to be picked up by himself later. When he goes to retrieve there product sometime later, he is pulled over by police and convinced to be a mole. During the next run with the team, the police are already waiting to arrest everyone because of their inside source. As police arrest and interrogate the crew, everyone turns in Nate as being the ringleader of the operation. The night before he’s due to be arrested, Nate’s financier alerts him of the news and encourages him to flee. Nate immediately flees to Canada but later returns after his mother is threatened with money laundering charges. At the end of the film, their whereabouts and status at the point of release are detailed.

Cast
Jonathan Daniel Brown as Nate Norman
Kenny Wormald as Topher
John C. McGinley as John Grefard
Ron Perlman as Barry Lerner
Aaron Yoo as Brendan Butler
Merritt Patterson as Nicole Grefard
Amanda Tapping as Teressia Lee Franks (Norman)
 Corey Large as Giovanni
Marz Lovejoy as Waitress

Production

The film was inspired by an article on the real Nate Norman written by Mark Binelli for Rolling Stone magazine, which was published in 2005. The story is based on the life of Nate Norman, an overweight high-school dropout and pizza delivery man in Coeur d'Alene, Idaho, who built a multimillion-dollar business smuggling marijuana from Canada before eventually getting caught and sentenced to prison for 12 years. He was released early and is currently living in Coeur d’Alene.

Some scenes were shot in a marijuana-growing facility in Canada, to which the crew was driven in a van with blacked-out windows.

Music video
On October 5, 2014 rapper Andrew Canton released a music video of the movie on his YouTube page.

Reception
The film holds a 71% rating on Rotten Tomatoes based on 7 reviews. It also has a rating of 54 on Metacritic based on six reviews, indicating "average or mixed reviews." The Los Angeles Times noted that despite the portrayal, protagonist Nate is not treated sympathetically by the creators of the film. They also noted that Ron Perlman's performance was excellent. Slant Magazine praised director Stockwell for capturing the "half-baked hubris that often accompanies adolescence." The New York Times thought that the younger cast and Ron Perlman had a good performance, but didn't like the voice-over due to it feeling "forced and unfunny". The Hollywood Reporter enjoyed the performances, but didn't think it handled the genre shift very well.

Box Office Mojo lists total domestic theater sales, in one theater as $5,565.

References

External links

2010s biographical films
2010s crime comedy-drama films
2014 comedy films
2014 drama films
2014 films
2014 in cannabis
American biographical films
American crime comedy-drama films
American films about cannabis
Biographical films about drug traffickers
Comedy-drama films based on actual events
Films based on newspaper and magazine articles
Films directed by John Stockwell
Films set in Idaho
Films set in the 2000s
Stoner films
Works about cannabis trafficking
2010s English-language films
2010s American films